Die Jagd nach dem Stiefel is an East German film. It was released in 1962.

Plot 
A fight broke out between KPD and SA men during the 1932 Reichstag election. On the same day in the evening one of those involved, the KPD man Ernst "Juhle" Schiemann, is found dead. When the police find a manslayer with his comrade Büttner, they accuse him of murder. Because his son Jack doesn't believe that his father is a murderer, he and his friends, who call themselves Redties, go in search of the real culprit. They use the impression of the sole of a boot, which can only come from the murderer. The sniffer dogs and Fritz, the son of a police inspector, try to hinder the already tedious and time-consuming search by any means necessary. Ultimately, however, the red-necks are successful and the actual murderer, who had taken his boot to the shoemaker, can be convicted of the crime. SA man Müller and his companion Bullrich are handed over to the police; Büttner is acquitted.

References

External links
 

1962 films
East German films
1960s German-language films
German children's films
Films set in Berlin
Films set in 1932
1960s German films